Robins may refer to:

Places

United States
Robins, Iowa, a small city 
Robins, Ohio, an unincorporated community
Robins Township, Fall River County, South Dakota
Robins Island, of the coast of New York state
Robins Air Force Base, Georgia
Robins Center, arena in Richmond, Virginia

People
Alison Robins (1920-2017), worked at Bletchley Park "Y-Service"
General Augustine Warner Robins (1882–1940), U.S. Army Air Corps
Benjamin Robins (1707–1751), English scientist, mathematician, and engineer
Bryce Robins (rugby union, born 1958) (born 1958), New Zealand rugby union player and All Black
Bryce Robins (born 1980), New Zealand and Japanese rugby union player, son of above
C. A. Robins (1884–1970), 22nd Governor of Idaho
C. Richard Robins (1928-2020), American ichthyologist 
Denise Robins (1897−1985), English romance novelist
Derrick Robins (1914–2004), English cricketer and sports promoter
Edward H. Robins (1881-1955), American actor
Edwin Frederick Robins (1870-1951) Anglican Bishop in Canada
Elizabeth Robins (1862–1952), actress, playwright, novelist, and suffragist
James Robins, American epidemiologist and biostatistician
John Robins (fl. 1650–2), English Ranter and plebeian prophet
John Robins (1926–2007), international union rugby player for Wales
Laila Robins (born 1959), American stage, film, and television actress
Mark Robins, English football manager
Mikey Robins, Australian media personality, comedian, and writer
Noel Robins (1935–2003), Australian sailor
Patricia Robins (born 1921), English romance novelist, daughter of Denise Robins
Paul Robins (1804–1890), a pioneer of the Bible Christian movement in North America
Robert H. "Bobby" Robins (1921−2000), English linguist
Robyn Robins (born 1951), rock and roll keyboardist, founding member of the Bob Seger Silver Bullet Band
Thomas Sewell Robins (c. 1810–1880), British painter of maritime themes
Toby Robins, Canadian actress and journalist
Vanessa Robins, Australian mathematician
Walter Robins (1906–1968), English cricketer and footballer

Entertainment
Robins (talk show), a Swedish talk television show on SVT2
The Robins, an American R&B singing group of the 1940s and 1950s

Sport
 Brooklyn Robins, name between 1914 and 1931 of the baseball franchise now known as the Los Angeles Dodgers.
 Shochiku Robins and Taiyō-Shochiku Robins, two former names of the Yokohama BayStars, a Japanese NPB team
 The Robins, a nickname for Altrincham Football Club, based in Greater Manchester, England
 The Robins, a nickname for Bracknell Town Football Club, based in England
 The Robins, a nickname for Bristol City Football Club, based in England, because of their red playing kit
 The Robins, a nickname for Cheltenham Town Football Club, based in England, because of their red playing kit
 The Robins, a nickname for Evesham United Football Club, based in Worcestershire, England
 The Robins, a nickname for Hull Kingston Rovers, the English Rugby league club, because of their red playing kit
 The Robins, a nickname for Ilkeston Football Club, based in Derbyshire, England
 The Robins, a nickname for Swindon Town Football Club, based in England, because of their red playing kit
 Swindon Robins, English Motorcycle Speedway team
 Brighton Robins, Australian rules football club based in Tasmania
 Kermandie Robins, Australian rules football club in Tasmania
 Peekskill Robins, formerly the Stamford Robins, American collegiate baseball team playing in an NCAA summer league

See also
Robbins (disambiguation)
Robin (disambiguation)

English-language surnames
Patronymic surnames